USNS Comet (T-AK-269), later T-LSV-7, later T-AKR-7, later SS Comet, is a vehicle landing ship built for the United States Navy. The lone ship of her class, she is named for the comet, and is the fourth U.S. Naval vessel to bear the name.

Comet was laid down 31 July 1957 under Maritime Administration contract (MA hull 42) at Sun Shipbuilding and Dry Dock Company of Chester, Pennsylvania; launched 31 July 1957; delivered to the Navy 27 January 1958; and placed in service under control of the Military Sealift Command (MSC) as cargo ship USNS Comet (T-AK-269).

Redesignated vehicle landing ship T-LSV-7 on 1 January 1963; further redesignated vehicle cargo ship /Roll-on/roll-off ship AKR-7 (date unknown), as such becoming one of the first ship in the world to be specifically designed for loading, shipping and discharge of Roll-on/roll-off cargoes.

Her title was transferred to MARAD, she was redesignated SS Comet and laid up in the National Defense Reserve Fleet, Suisun Bay, Benicia, California as a member of the MARAD Ready Reserve Force (RRF).

Reactivated in 2003 to ferry US Marine Engineers (12 Marines) and equipment from San Diego to Kuwait, with stops in Guam and Dubai/UAE in preparation for the Iraqi conflict (2003–present).

Removed from MSC control, withdrawn from the RRF by reassignment to the National Defense Reserve Fleet 28 July 2006.  In 2014, the Maritime Administration submitted a docket for disposing of the ship from the National Defense Reserve Fleet.

References

External links

Vehicle landing ships of the United States Navy
Ships built by the Sun Shipbuilding & Drydock Company
1957 ships
Historic American Engineering Record in California